Ranua Resort (better known as Ranua Zoo or Ranua Wildlife Park) is a zoo and a holiday resort that opened in 1983 in the municipality of Ranua, Lapland, Finland. It is the northernmost zoo in Finland and the second northest in the world. 

The zoo's animals consist of approximately 50 wild animal species and 150 individuals, including top predators such as lynx, brown bears and wolves but also European moose and deers. The zoo has Finland's only polar bears. The zoo is an accredited member of the European Association of Zoos and Aquaria (EAZA).

In addition to the zoo, Ranua Resort also offers accommodation, a restaurant, and a variety of activities such as snowmobiling, husky safaris and other outdoor experiences.

References

External links
 
 

Wildlife Park
Zoos in Finland
1983 establishments in Finland
Buildings and structures in Lapland (Finland)
Tourist attractions in Lapland (Finland)
Zoos established in 1983